David F. Denison  is a Canadian businessperson and the chair of Hydro One and Hydro One Inc. He is the former president and chief executive officer of the Canada Pension Plan Investment Board.

Biography
Denison earned a bachelor's degree in both mathematics and education from the University of Toronto. He is a Chartered Professional Accountant and a Fellow of the Institute of Chartered Accountants of Ontario.

Denison was the Chair of the Canadian Coalition for Good Governance from June 4, 2009, to June 15, 2011, and a corporate director of since June 23, 2005.  He has had an extensive career in financial services within Canada, the United States and Europe, with firms including Fidelity Investments (founded as Fidelity Management and Research Company), Merrill Lynch, S. G. Warburg, Midland Walwyn (bought by Merrill Lynch 2013), and Mercer.

He is the current a director of the United Way of Canada.

In 2014, he was named an Officer of the Order of Canada.

References

Living people
CPP Investment Board people
Canadian chief executives
Canadian chairpersons of corporations
Canadian corporate directors
Nonprofit businesspeople
Merrill (company) people
S. G. Warburg & Co. people
United Ways people
Canadian financiers
Officers of the Order of Canada
Year of birth missing (living people)